Tornau is a village and a former municipality in Wittenberg district in Saxony-Anhalt, Germany. Since 1 January 2011, it is part of the town Gräfenhainichen. It was part of the administrative community (Verwaltungsgemeinschaft) of Tor zur Dübener Heide.

Geography

Location
Tornau lies about 5 km north of Bad Düben in the Düben Heath Nature Park.

Neighbouring municipalities
Söllichau (Wittenberg district)
Bad Düben (Delitzsch district, Saxony)
Schwemsal (Anhalt-Bitterfeld district)
Schköna (Wittenberg district)

Economy and transportation
Federal Highway (Bundesstraße) B 2 between Leipzig and Wittenberg runs straight through the municipality, while State Highway (Landesstraße) 130, which connects to the B 2 and the B 183/107, crosses the municipal area.

References

External links
Verwaltungsgemeinschaft's website

Former municipalities in Saxony-Anhalt
Gräfenhainichen